Six Hours to Lose is a 1947 French romance film directed by Alex Joffé and Jean Lévitte and starring André Luguet, Denise Grey and Pierre Larquey. The film has no relation to the eponymous novel of Robert Brasillach, edited posthumously in 1953.

The film's sets were designed by the art director Paul-Louis Boutié and Guy de Gastyne.

Plot
A traveller is stuck in an unknown town because his connecting train will only arrive in six hours. He decides to kill time by taking a stroll. He is not prepared to get confused with somebody else. In fact the citizens are eagerly awaiting the visit of a famous man and the clueless traveller is his doppelgänger. Soon he experiences what that means.

Cast 
 André Luguet as traveller / Léopold de Witt
 Denise Grey as Misses de Witt
 Pierre Larquey as Joseph
 Paulette Dubost as Annette
 Jacqueline Pierreux as Simone
 Dany Robin as Rosy
 Louis de Funès as the driver
 Luce Fabiole as the passenger
 Marguerite de Morlaye as the rich widow
 Jean-Jacques Delbo as Claude
 Jean Gaven as Antoine

References

External links 
 
 

1947 films
1940s French-language films
1940s romance films
French black-and-white films
French romance films
Pathé films
Films directed by Alex Joffé
1940s French films